The 1968 Macdonald Brier, Canada's national men's curling championship was held March 4–8 at the Kelowna Arena in Kelowna, British Columbia. A total of 25,813 fans attended the event.

Team Alberta, who was skipped by Ron Northcott captured the Brier Tankard by finishing round robin play with a 9-1 record. This was Alberta's tenth Brier championship overall and the second one won by Northcott's rink, who also won the Brier two years prior in 1966. Northcott's rink would represent Canada in the 1968 Air Canada Silver Broom, which was the men's world curling championship.

Saskatchewan were runners-up, with an 8–2 record while Prince Edward Island finished in third with a 7-3 record, which at the time was PEI's best Brier finish.

Teams
The teams are listed as follows:

Round Robin standings
The final standings were as follows:

Round-robin results

Draw 1
Monday, March 4, 4:00pm

Draw 2
Monday, March 4, 11:00pm

Draw 3
Tuesday, March 5, 12:00pm

Draw 4
Tuesday, March 5, 5:30pm

Draw 5
Wednesday, March 6, 5:30pm

Draw 6
Wednesday, March 6, 11:00pm

Draw 7
Thursday, March 7, 12:00pm

Draw 8
Thursday, March 7, 5:30pm

Draw 9
Thursday, March 7, 11:00pm

Draw 10
Friday, March 8, 12:00pm

Draw 11
Friday, March 8, 5:30pm

Awards

All-Star Team 
The media selected the following curlers as All-Stars:

Bernie Sparkes became the first player to be selected to the all-star team three times as he was selected the two previous years as well.

Ross G.L. Harstone Award
The Ross Harstone Award was presented to the player chosen by their fellow peers as the curler who best represented Harstone's high ideals of good sportsmanship, observance of the rules, exemplary conduct and curling ability.

Records
Prince Edward Island's 17-16 extra end victory over Newfoundland in Draw 11 tied the record for the highest scoring game in Brier history. This was also matched in 1932 with Ontario's 17-16 win over New Brunswick and in 1957 with Saskatchewan's 30-3 victory over New Brunswick.

References

External links
 Video:  (YouTube-channel «Curling Canada»)

1968
Curling in British Columbia
Macdonald Brier
Macdonald Brier
Macdonald Brier
Sport in Kelowna